ONE Fighting Championship: Champion vs. Champion (also known as ONE FC 1) was the inaugural mixed martial arts event held by ONE Championship. The event took place on September 3, 2011 at the 12,000 capacity Singapore Indoor Stadium in Kallang, Singapore. It is the first and only event held by the organization in 2011.

Background
ONE Championship instituted Pride Fighting Championships rules combined with Nevada's unified rules; this allowed for soccer kicks, head stomps, knees on the ground, and permitting the use of elbows.

The event was  broadcast on domestic TV in Singapore by MediaCorp Channel 5.  The event also streamed live on Sherdog to all countries except Singapore.

This led multiple media sources  to describe ONE Fighting Championship: Champion vs. Champion as "the biggest event in Asian mixed martial arts history" and to speculate that the TV audience might be the biggest ever for a mixed martial arts event.

On 17 August 2011 it was announced that A Sol Kwon, a Korean fighter on a six fight win streak, would be replacing the injured Ole Laursen in the main event against Eduard Folayang.

Results

See also
 List of ONE Championship champions
 List of ONE Championship events

References

ONE Championship events
2011 in mixed martial arts